is a Japanese animator, storyboard artist, and director, best known for directing the acclaimed anime series Monster and Made in Abyss. He was born on March 11, 1961, in Yamanashi, Yamanashi, Japan.

Career
Kojima first got his start in the animation business in the 1980s, where he worked primarily project-to-project for a number of different companies, including Knack Productions and Tatsunoko Production. During this time, his involvement was in television products mostly as an episode director. After joining Madhouse in the 1990s, he took part in dozens of productions as an animator, as well as helming several TV series, two movies, a theatrical short, and a TV special. He has since left the studio and joined Kinema Citrus in 2011.

Style
Since coming to work for Madhouse, Kojima has been primarily a drama director, and one who specializes in lengthy series. He has directed two adaptations of Naoki Urasawa's manga, Master Keaton and Monster, both of which have received critical acclaim. His first full-length theatrical film, Piano no Mori, was released in Japan on July 21, 2007.

Filmography

Director
Azuki-chan (1995–1998) - Series Director, Storyboard, Animation Director
DNA Sights 999.9 (1998) - Director, Storyboard
Master Keaton (1998–1999) - Series Director, Storyboard (eps. 1–2, 4, 13), Episode Director (eps. 2, 13)
Leave it to Kero! Theatrical Version (2000) - Director
Magical Shopping Arcade Abenobashi (2002) - Series Director, Storyboard (eps. 2, 10, 12), Episode Director (ep. 2)
Hanada Shōnen Shi (2002) - Director
Monster (2004–2005) - Director, Storyboard (eps. 1–2, 6, 8, 38, 67, 73-74), Episode Director (eps. 1, 73), Key Animation
A Spirit of the Sun (2006) - Director, Storyboard
Piano no Mori (2007) - Director, Storyboard
The Tibetan Dog (2011) - Director, Storyboard
Busou Shinki: Moon Angel (2011-2012) - Director, Storyboard, Episode Director
Bottom Biting Bug (2012-2013) - Director (eps. 1-52)
Black Bullet (2014) - Director, Key Animation (ep. 13)
Made in Abyss (2017–2022) - Director, Storyboard (eps. 1–3, 5, 8-10, 12-13), Episode Director (ep. 12)

Other
Cybot Robotchi (1982–1983) - Episode Director
Okawari-Boy Starzan S (1984) - Storyboard, Episode Director
Aru Kararu no Isan OVA (1993) - Storyboard
Cardcaptor Sakura (1998) - Storyboard (ep. 2)
Reign: The Conqueror (1999) - Storyboard
Sakura Wars (2000) - Animation Director
Shingu: Secret of the Stellar Wars (2001) - Storyboard
Space Pirate Captain Herlock The Endless Odyssey OVA (2002) - Storyboard (eps. 7-8)
Trava: Fist Planet OVA (2003) - In-Between Animation
Texhnolyze (2003) - Storyboard (ep. 7)
Gungrave (2003–2004) - Key Animation (eps. 1–2, 8, 18)
Gunslinger Girl (2003–2004) - Storyboard (ep. 3)
Gokusen (2004) - Storyboard
Samurai Champloo (2004–2005) - Key Animation (eps. 5, 22)
Trinity Blood (2005) - Storyboard
Black Lagoon (2006) - Key Animation

External links
 

Anime directors
1961 births
People from Yamanashi Prefecture
Japanese animators
Japanese animated film directors
Living people
Madhouse (company) people